Green City or Green Town may refer
 Bhopal, Green city of India
 Etawah, Green city of Uttar Pradesh 
 Gandhinagar, capital city of Gujarat state in India, known as
 Trivandrum, capital city of Kerala state in India, known as "Evergreen city of India"
 Green City, Missouri, United States
 Green Town, a residential area of Lahore, Pakistan
 Zelenograd, a city in Russia under jurisdiction of Moscow
 Zelenogradsk, a city in Kaliningrad Oblast, Russia
 Zelyony Gorod, an urban-type settlement in Russia under jurisdiction of Nizhny Novgorod

See also 
 Green cities
 Emerald City (disambiguation)
 Garden City (disambiguation)
 Garden town (disambiguation)
 Verville, "green town" in French, a surname